Pavel Machotka (August 21, 1936 - March 18, 2019) was a Czech-born American academic and painter. He was a professor of Psychology of Aesthetics at the University of California, Santa Cruz from 1970 to 1994. He was the author of several books, including two about French painter Paul Cézanne.

Early life
Machotka was born in 1936 in Prague, Czechoslovakia. He emigrated to the United States with his family in 1948 to escape communist repression, following the communist coup d'état. Machotka attended college at the University of Chicago at 16, and he earned a PhD in Psychology from Harvard University.

Career
Machotka was a professor of Psychology of Aesthetics at the University of California, Santa Cruz from 1970 to 1994. He was awarded an honorary doctorate from Charles University in Prague in 1998.

Machotka (co-)authored several books about psychology and the arts, including two books about French painter Paul Cézanne. His research showed that Cézanne was a realist, and that Cubists had misunderstood his work. In Cézanne: Landscape Into Art, Machotka juxtaposed modern-day pictures with paintings by Cézanne, as John Rewald and Erle Loran had previously done, but went further by emphasising Cezanne's realism.

Machotka was also a painter in his own right.

Death
Machotka died on March 18, 2019, at 82.

Selected works

References

1936 births
2019 deaths
Czechoslovak emigrants to the United States
University of Chicago alumni
Harvard University alumni
University of California, Santa Cruz faculty
American art critics
American male painters
20th-century American painters
21st-century American painters
20th-century American male artists